Singsås Idrettslag is a Norwegian multi-sports club from Singsås, Sør-Trøndelag. It has sections for football, handball, Nordic skiing and athletics.

The club was founded in 1920. The men's football team currently plays in the 6. Divisjon, the seventh tier of Norwegian football. It had a stint in the 3. divisjon from 1996 to 1999.

References

Official site 

Football clubs in Norway
Association football clubs established in 1920
Sport in Trøndelag
Midtre Gauldal
1920 establishments in Norway
Athletics in Norway